Casual Peeps at Sophia is a collection of essays and addresses by Allama I I Kazi. It was published by the Sindhi Adabi Board in 1967. The subjects dealt within these essays and addresses cover a wide range of topics such as philosophy, religion, history, poetry, art and literary criticism.

References 

Literary criticism
Philosophy essays
Philosophy lectures
Pakistani philosophy
Pakistani philosophical literature